The 2008 EU Cup of Australian rules football was held in Prague (Czech Republic) on October 11, 2008, with 12 teams. The championship was won by England, defeating Croatia in the final.

Teams

Pools round

Final round

1/8-finals

 Germany, England, Croatia and Sweden are classified to quarterfinals.

9-12 places

Quarter finals

5-8 places

Semifinals

11-12 places

9-10 places

7-8 places

5-6 places

3-4 places

FINAL

Final standings

Notes and references

See also
EU Cup

External links
EU Cup 2008 official website 
Results at The Footy Record

EU Cup
International sports competitions hosted by the Czech Republic
EU Cup
2008 in European sport
2008 in Australian rules football
2000s in Prague